Adaina is a genus of moths in the family Pterophoridae.

Species

Adaina ambrosiae 
Adaina atahualpa 
Adaina beckeri 
Adaina bernardi 
Adaina bipunctatus 
Adaina bolivari 
Adaina cinerascens 
Adaina costarica 
Adaina desolata 
Adaina everdinae 
Adaina excreta 
Adaina fuscahodias 
Adaina gentilis 
Adaina hodias 
Adaina invida 
Adaina ipomoeae 
Adaina microdactoides 
Adaina microdactyla 
Adaina montanus 
Adaina obscura 
Adaina parainvida 
Adaina periarga 
Adaina perplexus 
Adaina planaltina 
Adaina praeusta 
Adaina primulacea 
Adaina propria 
Adaina scalesiae 
Adaina simplicius 
Adaina thomae 
Adaina zephyria 

Moth genera
Oidaematophorini
Taxa named by J. W. Tutt